John J. Castelot,  (August 26, 1916 – May 14, 1999) was an American Roman Catholic priest, Sulpician, teacher, and writer.

Early life and studies 
John J. Castelot was born in Bridgeport, Connecticut, United States, on August 26, 1916. He was ordained priest on May 14, 1942.
Later on he did graduate studies at the Catholic University of America, Washington, D.C. and at the Pontifical Biblical Institute in Rome. Fr. John Castelot, also known as Fr. Jack, was a Sulpician and priest of the Archdiocese of Detroit.

Career 
After his studies, John J. Castelot was teacher of Sacred Scripture, Greek, Hebrew, and Sacred Music at the St. John's Provincial Seminary, in Plymouth, Michigan, but he also taught at St Joseph's College, Mountain View, California and at the Sulpitian Novitiate in Baltimore, Maryland.
From 1972 he was a collaborator at St. Edith's Parish in Livonia, Michigan.

Castelot Summer Scripture (now Castelot Scripture), a conference named in honor of Fr. John (Jack) Castelot, started at St. John's Provincial Seminary in 1996. Fr. John died on May 14, 1999.

Works 
Castelot wrote the three volumes of Meet the Bible! and a shorter commentary on the Holy Scripture.
For more than 20 years he wrote a column on the Bible for the "Faith Alive!" a religious education series distributed by Catholic News Service.
He wrote the voices "Gentiles", "St. Peter Apostle", and "Gerard Van Noort" for the New Catholic Encyclopedia.
For The Jerome Biblical Commentary (1968), he wrote, in collaboration with Aelred Cody, the chapter "Religious institutions of Israel".

References

External resources
 Castelot Summer Facebook page 

20th-century American Roman Catholic priests
Sulpicians
Roman Catholic Archdiocese of Detroit
American Roman Catholic religious writers